Rettenmaier is a surname. Notable people with the surname include:

Marvin Rettenmaier (born 1986), German professional poker player
Travis Rettenmaier (born 1983), American professional tennis player

German-language surnames